This is a list of universities in Ghana. For the purposes of this list, colleges and universities are defined as accredited, degree-granting, tertiary-level institutions. Small universities (especially private ones) are affiliated to larger established public institutions, and most higher education institutions are named "university college". The country's colleges which are incorporated with universities are listed as "university college". The country's "polytechnics" are also listed.

There are other educational institutions in Ghana - some are local campuses of foreign universities, some conduct classes for students who write their exams at the distance-education centers of the larger Ghanaian universities. Universities and colleges are accredited by the National Accreditation Board - Ghana under the Ministry of Education - Ghana.

References

External links 
 Webometrics ranking of world universities (universities in Ghana)
 Universities in Ghana by G. F. Daniels
 Ghanaweb.com: Universities

Universities
 
Ghana
Ghana